The Treaty of St. Louis is the name of a series of treaties signed between the United States and various Native American tribes from 1804 through 1824.  The fourteen treaties were all signed in the St. Louis, Missouri area.

The Treaty of St. Louis of 1816 was treaty signed by Ninian Edwards, William Clark, and Auguste Chouteau for the United States and representatives of the Council of Three Fires (united tribes of Ottawa, Ojibwa, and Potawatomi) residing on the Illinois and Milwaukee rivers, signed on August 24, 1816, and proclaimed on December 30, 1816.  Despite the name, the treaty was conducted at Portage des Sioux, Missouri, located immediately north of St. Louis, Missouri.

By signing the treaty, the tribes, their chiefs, and their warriors relinquished all right, claim, and title to land previously ceded to the United States by the Sac and Fox tribes on November 3, 1804 (see, Treaty of St. Louis (1804)), In the treaty, the united tribes also ceded a 20-mile strip of land to the United States, which connected Chicago and Lake Michigan with the Illinois River.  In 1848, the Illinois and Michigan Canal was built on the ceded land and, in 1900, the Chicago Sanitary and Ship Canal.

The specific land given up included:

In exchange the tribes were to be paid $1,000 in merchandise over 12 years. The land was surveyed by John C. Sullivan and its land was originally intended as land grant rewards for volunteers in the War of 1812. 

Today, Indian Boundary Park in West Ridge, Chicago commemorates this Treaty.

See also 
 Osage Treaty (disambiguation), several treaties
List of treaties
Indian Boundary Park - Chicago
First Treaty of Prairie du Chien
Second Treaty of Prairie du Chien
Third Treaty of Prairie du Chien
Fourth Treaty of Prairie du Chien
Treaty of Chicago

References

External links 
Kappler Project - Text of the 1816 Treaty

1816 treaties
United States and Native American treaties
14th United States Congress
History of St. Louis
1816 in Illinois Territory
Native American history of Illinois